Full communion is a communion or relationship of full agreement among different Christian denominations or Christian individuals that share certain essential principles of Christian theology. Views vary among denominations on exactly what constitutes full communion, but typically when two or more denominations are in full communion it enables services and celebrations, such as the Eucharist, to be shared among congregants or clergy of any of them with the full approval of each.

Definition and terminology

Full communion is an ecclesiological term for an established relationship between Christian denominations that may be constituted by shared eucharist, doctrine, and ecclesiology.  Different denominations emphasize different aspects or define the term differently.

Several Protestant denominations base their idea of full communion on the Augsburg Confession which says that "the true unity of the church" is present where "the gospel is rightly preached and sacraments rightly administered." They believe that full communion between two denominations is not a merger, they respect each other's differences, but rather it's when two denominations develop a relationship based on a mutual understanding and recognition of Baptism and sharing of the Lord's Supper. They may worship together, exchange clergy, and share commitments to evangelism and service. For example, groups recognized as being in full communion with the Evangelical Lutheran Church, on this basis, include the Presbyterian Church (USA), Reformed Church in America, United Church of Christ, the Episcopal Church (United States), the Moravian Church, and the United Methodist Church. These churches are not necessarily in full communion with each other, however; each denomination is free to develop its own relationships with other churches. For example, The Episcopal Church, in addition to being a member of the Anglican Communion, is in full communion with the Evangelical Lutheran Church in America, Moravian Church (Northern and Southern Provinces), Mar Thoma Syrian Church of India, Old Catholic Churches of the Union of Utrecht, Philippine Independent Church, and the Church of Sweden. They are not, currently, in full communion with the Presbyterian Church (USA), Reformed Church in America, or the United Church of Christ, though they are currently in dialogue with other churches; including the United Methodist Church, Presbyterian Church (USA), and Roman Catholic Church.

By Christian denomination

Lutheran Churches

Reformed Churches

The United Church of Christ (UCC) defines full communion as meaning that "divided churches recognize each others' sacraments and provide for the orderly transfer of ministers from one denomination to another." Some of these go back to the 17th century Pilgrims in Holland; other relationships are recent. The UCC is in full communion alliance with the members of the World Communion of Reformed Churches, the Union of Evangelical Churches in Germany, the Presbyterian Church in the US, and several others in North America and elsewhere.

Anglican Communion 

The Anglican Communion distinguishes between full communion and intercommunion. It applies the first term to situations "where between two Churches, not of the same denominational or confessional family, there is unrestricted communio in sacris including mutual recognition and acceptance of ministries", and the second term to situations "where varying degrees of relation other than full communion are established by agreement between two such Churches". This distinction differs from the distinction that the Catholic Church makes between full and partial communion in that the Anglican concept of intercommunion implies a formal agreement entered into by the churches concerned. As with other Protestant traditions, the Anglican understanding of full communion differs from that of the Roman Catholic Church and Eastern Orthodoxy, which consider that full communion between churches involves them becoming a single church, as in the case of the particular churches "in which and formed out of which the one and unique Catholic Church exists".

In addition the Anglican Communion recognizes the possibility of full communion between some of its member provinces or churches and other churches, without having the entire Anglican Communion share that relationship. An example is the Porvoo Communion, which is largely composed of Evangelical Lutheran Churches.

The Anglican Communion established full communion with the Old Catholic Churches on the basis of the 1931 Bonn Agreement, which established three principles:
 Each communion recognizes the catholicity and independence of the other and maintains its own.
 Each communion agrees to admit members of the other communion to participate in the sacraments.
 Full communion does not require from either communion the acceptance of all doctrinal opinion, sacramental devotion or liturgical practice characteristic of the other, but implies that each believes the other to hold all the essentials of the Christian faith.

The Anglicans Online website provides a list of non-Anglican churches "in full communion with the See of Canterbury" and also indicates some important ecumenical agreements of local character (i.e., not involving the whole of the Anglican Communion) with other non-Anglican churches. It also lists churches that, in spite of bearing names (such as "Anglican" or "Episcopal") that might suggest a relationship with the Anglican Communion, are not in communion with it.

Catholic Church

Full versus partial communion

The Catholic Church makes a distinction between full and partial communion: where full communion exists, there is but the one Church; partial communion, on the other hand, exists where some elements of Christian faith are held in common, but complete unity on essentials is lacking. Accordingly, they see the Church as in partial communion with Protestants and in much closer, but still incomplete, communion with Orthodox Churches. It has expressed this distinction in documents such as Unitatis redintegratio, the Second Vatican Council's decree on ecumenism, which states: "quite large communities came to be separated from full communion with the Catholic Church. [...] Men who believe in Christ and have been truly baptized are in communion with the Catholic Church even though this communion is imperfect".

Nonetheless, the Second Vatican Council used the word "communion" in a sense other than communio in sacris when speaking of Christians separated from the Catholic Church. The Catechism of the Catholic Church, citing the Second Vatican Council and Pope Paul VI, states:

Full communion thus involves completeness of "those bonds of communion – faith, sacraments and pastoral governance – that permit the Faithful to receive the life of grace within the Church."

Universal and particular Churches

In Catholicism, the "universal Church" means Catholicism itself, from the Greek adjective καθολικός (katholikos), meaning "universal". The term particular church denotes an ecclesiastical community headed by a bishop or equivalent, and this can include both local dioceses as well as autonomous (or sui juris) particular churches, which include other rites such as the Latin Church and the Eastern Catholic Churches.

A 1992 Congregation for the Doctrine of the Faith (CDF) letter to Catholic bishops expressed this idea as: the universal Church cannot be conceived as the sum of the particular Churches, or as a federation of particular Churches'. It is not the result of the communion of the Churches, but, in its essential mystery, it is a reality ontologically and temporally prior to every individual particular Church".

List of Catholic churches in full communion

The autonomous Catholic churches in full communion with the Holy See are:
Of Alexandrian liturgical tradition:
Coptic Catholic Church
Eritrean Catholic Church
Ethiopian Catholic Church
Of Syro-Antiochian or West Syriac   liturgical tradition:
Maronite Church
Syrian Catholic Church
Syro-Malankara Catholic Church
Of Armenian liturgical tradition:
Armenian Catholic Church
Of Byzantine (Constantinopolitan) liturgical tradition:
Albanian Greek Catholic Church
Belarusian Greek Catholic Church
Bulgarian Greek Catholic Church
Byzantine Catholic Church of Croatia and Serbia
Greek Byzantine Catholic Church
Hungarian Greek Catholic Church
Italo-Albanian Catholic Church
Macedonian Greek Catholic Church
Melkite Greek Catholic Church
Romanian Greek Catholic Church
Russian Byzantine Catholic Church
Ruthenian Catholic Church
Slovak Greek Catholic Church
Ukrainian Greek Catholic Church
Of Chaldean or East Syriac tradition:
Chaldean Catholic Church
Syro-Malabar Church
Of Western liturgical tradition:
Latin Church

Sharing in the Eucharist

As a practical matter for most Catholics, full communion means that a member of one Church may partake of the Eucharist celebrated in another, and for priests, that they are accepted as celebrants of the Eucharist in the other Church.

Restrictions in this matter were already in force in the second century as witnessed to by Justin Martyr in his First Apology: "No one is allowed to partake (of the Eucharist) but the man who believes that the things which we teach are true, and who has been washed with the washing that is for the remission of sins, and unto regeneration, and who is so living as Christ has enjoined."

For acceptance into full communion with the Catholic Church a specific profession of the faith of the Catholic Church is required even of those who have been members of a separate church whose sacraments the Catholic Church considers to be valid. Being "in full communion with the Catholic Church" requires that they "firmly accept" its teaching on faith and morals.

Intercommunion usually means an agreement between churches by which all members of each church (clergy with clergy, or laity with laity, respectively) may participate in the other's Eucharistic celebrations or may hold joint celebrations. The Catholic Church has entered into no such agreement: it allows no Eucharistic concelebration by its clergy with clergy of churches not in full communion with it.

The Directory for the Application of Principles and Norms on Ecumenism indicates the limited circumstances in which Catholics may receive the Eucharist from clergy of churches not in full communion (never if those churches are judged not to have valid apostolic succession and thus valid Eucharist), and in which Catholic clergy may administer the sacraments to members of other churches.

The norms there indicated for the giving of the Eucharist to other Christians (communicatio in sacris) are summarized in canon 844 of the Latin Church's 1983 Code of Canon Law. The Code of Canons of the Eastern Churches (CCEO) indicates that the norms of the Directory apply also to the clergy and laity of the Eastern Catholic Churches.

Eastern Orthodox
Eastern Orthodox have an understanding of what full communion means that is very similar to that of the Catholic Church. Though they have no figure corresponding to that of the Roman Catholic Pope, performing a function like that of the Pope's Petrine Office for the whole of their respective communions, they see each of their autocephalous churches as embodiments of, respectively, the One, Holy, Catholic and Apostolic Church. They too consider full communion an essential condition for common sharing in the Eucharist.

For the autocephalous churches that form the Eastern Orthodox Church, see Eastern Orthodox Church organization. Their number is somewhat in dispute.

Church of the East
The Church of the East is currently divided into churches that are not in full communion with one another. The Assyrian Church of the East and the Ancient Church of the East divided in the 20th century over the former's limitation of the post of patriarch to members of a single family and due to the adoption of the New Calendar by the former. There is movement towards reunity, but they are not in full communion with one another at present. The Chaldean Catholic Church shares a similar history with both, but is currently in full communion with neither. The Catholic Church, of which the Chaldean Church is part, allows its ministers to give the Eucharist to members of Eastern churches who seek it on their own accord and are properly disposed, and it allows its faithful who cannot approach a Catholic minister to receive the Eucharist, when necessary or spiritually advantageous, from ministers of non-Catholic churches that have a recognised Eucharist.

The Guidelines for Admission to the Eucharist between the Chaldean Church and the Assyrian Church of the East explicitly apply these rules, which hold also for the Ancient Church of the East and all Eastern Orthodox churches, to the Assyrian Church of the East. "When necessity requires, Assyrian faithful are permitted to participate and to receive Holy Communion in a Chaldean celebration of the Holy Eucharist; in the same way, Chaldean faithful for whom it is physically or morally impossible to approach a Catholic minister, are permitted to participate and to receive Holy Communion in an Assyrian celebration of the Holy Eucharist".

Oriental Orthodox churches 

The Oriental Orthodox Churches have a similar understanding of communion as the Eastern Orthodox Church and Roman Catholic Church. There is no leader of all the Oriental Orthodox Churches. All churches within the Oriental Orthodox Churches are autocephalous and operate and function on their own. All Oriental Orthodox Churches are in full communion with each other. They can take part in all the 7 sacraments from each other's churches.

The Oriental Orthodox churches are:

Syriac Orthodox Church of Antioch
Coptic Orthodox Church of Alexandria
Armenian Apostolic Church
Eritrean Orthodox Tewahedo Church
Ethiopian Orthodox Tewahedo Church
Malankara Orthodox Syrian Church

The Oriental Orthodox Churches have a relationship with the Roman Catholic Church, and is working on a relationship with the Eastern Orthodox Church and other Christian Churches.

The Oriental Orthodox Churches believe in Apostolic Succession, the concept that Jesus Christ gave spiritual authority to the 12 Apostles and 72 Disciples, and that authority has been passed on till this day.

For example, the Syriac Orthodox Patriarch of Antioch is considered the Successor of St. Peter, the Coptic Orthodox Pope of Alexandria is considered the Successor of St. Mark, the Armenian Apostolic Catholicos of Armenia is considered the Successor of St. Bartholomew and St. Thaddeus, the Catholicos of the East of India is considered the Successor of St.Thomas the Apostle

Likewise, the Oriental Orthodox Church acknowledges the Greek Orthodox Patriarch of Constantiople as the Successor of St. Andrew and the Roman Catholic Pope of Rome as the Successor of St. Peter and St. Paul. Due to the schisms at the Synod of Chalcedon, the tensions between the churches have been high, but in recent years the leaders of all churches have acknowledged each other, and are working on a relationship with each other.

Other churches

Churches or denominations holding to open communion allow all persons who consider themselves "Christian believers" to participate, even without any arrangement of full communion with the other church or denomination involved, and still less requiring an arrangement involving interchangeability of ordained ministers.

It is in the stronger sense of becoming a single church that in 2007 the Traditional Anglican Communion sought "full communion" with the Roman Catholic Church as a sui iuris (particular Church) jurisdiction, but in 2012 declined the possibility offered by Pope Benedict XVI to join a personal ordinariate for former Anglicans in full communion with the see of Rome.

Agreements between churches 

The following groupings of churches have arrangements for or are working on arrangements for:
 mutual recognition of members
 joint celebration of the Lord's Supper/Holy Communion/Eucharist (these churches practice open communion)
 mutual recognition of ordained ministers
 mutual recognition of sacraments
 a common commitment to mission.

Agreements completed
 The Anglican Communion, the Union of Utrecht of the Old Catholic Churches, the Mar Thoma Syrian Church of India, and the Philippine Independent Church
 The Churches of the Porvoo Communion.
 The Anglican Church of Canada, the Evangelical Lutheran Church in Canada, the Episcopal Church in the United States of America, and the Evangelical Lutheran Church in America.
 The Evangelical Lutheran Church in America and each of the following: the member churches of the Lutheran World Federation, the Episcopal Church in the United States of America, the Presbyterian Church (USA), the Reformed Church in America, the United Church of Christ, the United Methodist Church and the Moravian Church in America.
 The Leuenberg Agreement, concluded in 1973 and adopted by 105 European Protestant churches, since renamed the Community of Protestant Churches in Europe.
 The Moravian Church and each of the following: the Evangelical Lutheran Church in America and the Episcopal Church in the United States of America.
 The United Methodist Church with the African Methodist Episcopal Church, the African Methodist Episcopal Zion Church, the African Union Methodist Protestant Church, the Christian Methodist Episcopal Church, the Evangelical Lutheran Church in America, the Union American Methodist Episcopal Church, and the Northern and Southern Provinces of the Moravian Church.
 The United Church of Christ and each of the following: the Christian Church (Disciples of Christ), the Evangelical Lutheran Church in America, Presbyterian Church (USA), and the Reformed Church in America.
 The United Episcopal Church of North America and each of the following: the Anglican Catholic Church, the Anglican Province of Christ the King, and the Diocese of the Great Lakes.
 The Anglican Province of America has intercommunion with the Reformed Episcopal Church and the Church of Nigeria.
 The Church of Ireland and the Methodist Church in Ireland have established full communion and are working toward interchangeability of ministry.
 The Union of Utrecht of the Old Catholic Churches and the Church of Sweden are in full communion since the joint signature of the Uppsala Agreement in 2016.

Agreements in progress
 The United Methodist Council of Bishops have approved interim agreements for sharing the Eucharist with the Episcopal Church in the United States of America.
 The Methodist Church of Great Britain is currently working toward full communion with the Church of England and the United Reformed Church.

See also

 Closed communion
 Ecclesiastical separatism
 Ecumenism
 Eucharist
 Koinonia
 Open communion
 Personal ordinariate

Notes

References

Sources

Further reading

External links
Broken but Never Divided: An Eastern Orthodox Perspective

Ecclesiology
Christian ecumenism
Christian terminology